"Electric Boogaloo" is a dance-pop song by American music duo Ollie & Jerry. Released in late 1984 as the lead single from the soundtrack to the film Breakin' 2: Electric Boogaloo, the song reached number 45 on the R&B chart.

Background 
Detroit natives and prolific session musicians Ollie E. Brown and Jerry Knight first collaborated as the duo Ollie & Jerry on the soundtrack to the 1984 breakdancing-themed film Breakin'. The first track of that album, "Breakin'... There's No Stopping Us", was released as a single and reached number 9 on the Billboard Hot 100 in the summer of 1984.

Following the success of this record, Ollie & Jerry were asked to contribute music for the Breakin's sequel, Breakin' 2: Electric Boogaloo. The term "electric boogaloo" refers to a dance style of the same name. The duo recorded the track "Electric Boogaloo", which was released as a single.

Although the "Electric Boogaloo" single was less successful than its predecessor (not charting on Billboard''s Top 40), the Breakin' 2 soundtrack itself did reach number 25 on the Billboard R&B Albums chart and number 52 on the Billboard 200 albums chart.

Personnel 
Ollie Brown - drums
Jerry Knight - bass guitar

Charts

References 

1984 songs
1984 singles
Ollie & Jerry songs
Polydor Records singles
Songs written by Ollie E. Brown
Songs written by Jerry Knight